Is Paris Burning? is a 1966 epic black-and-white war film about the liberation of Paris in August 1944 by the French Resistance and the Free French Forces during World War II. A French-American co-production, it was directed by French filmmaker René Clément, with a screenplay by Gore Vidal, Francis Ford Coppola, Jean Aurenche, Pierre Bost and Claude Brulé, adapted from the 1965 book of the same title by Larry Collins and Dominique Lapierre. The film stars an international ensemble cast that includes French (Jean-Paul Belmondo, Alain Delon, Bruno Cremer, Pierre Vaneck, Jean-Pierre Cassel, Leslie Caron, Charles Boyer, Yves Montand), American (Orson Welles, Kirk Douglas, Glenn Ford, Robert Stack, Anthony Perkins, George Chakiris) and German (Gert Fröbe, Hannes Messemer, Ernst Fritz Fürbringer, Harry Meyen, Wolfgang Preiss) stars.

The film was released in France on October 26, 1966 and in the United States on November 10, 1966. It received generally positive reviews, and was the fourth-most-popular film of the year in France for 1966. It was nominated for Best Cinematography (Black and White) and Academy Award for Best Art Direction at the 40th Academy Awards and a Golden Globe Award for Best Original Score.

Plot
Shortly after the failed 20 July plot to assassinate him in 1944, Adolf Hitler appoints General der Infanterie Dietrich von Choltitz as military governor of occupied Paris. Hitler believes that Choltitz will obey his order that the Allies should not be allowed to capture Paris without the Germans destroying it completely, similarly to the planned destruction of Warsaw.

The French Resistance learn that the Allies are not planning to take Paris, but are bypassing it to avoid confrontation and are heading straight to Germany instead. The two factions within the Resistance react to this news differently. The Gaullists under Jacques Chaban-Delmas want to wait and see, while the communists under Colonel Rol-Tanguy want to take action. The communists force the issue by calling for a general uprising by the citizens of Paris and by occupying important government buildings. The Gaullists go along with this plan of action once it is set in motion.

Initially, Choltitz is intent on following Hitler's order to level the city. After his troops fail to dislodge the Resistance from the Paris Police Prefecture, he orders the Luftwaffe to bomb the building but withdraws the order at the urging of Swedish consul Raoul Nordling, who points out that bombs that miss the Prefecture risk destroying nearby culturally invaluable buildings such as the Notre Dame Cathedral. Choltitz accepts a truce offer from the Resistance (conceived by the Gaullist faction), but the communists want to keep on fighting, in spite of a lack of ammunition. Therefore, the truce is shortened to one day and the fighting resumes.

After learning that the Germans plan to destroy Paris (the Eiffel Tower and other landmarks are rigged with explosives), a messenger from the Resistance is sent across enemy lines to contact the Americans. He informs the Allies that the Resistance has already taken control of parts of the city and implores them to provide support to prevent the uprising being crushed as was then happening in Warsaw. He adds that France would never forgive the Allies if they permit the destruction of Paris. Later, General Omar Bradley agrees that the 2nd Armored Division under General Philippe Leclerc should move on Paris.

As the German military situation deteriorates, Choltitz delays the order to destroy Paris, believing that Hitler is insane and that the war is lost, making the destruction of Paris a futile gesture. When two SS officers arrive, he thinks that he is to be arrested, but instead they simply state that Himmler has asked them to rescue the Bayeux Tapestry for his private collection prior to the destruction of the Louvre.

Eventually, the French major persuades General Leclerc that it is essential for at least a token force of Allied tanks to move in and occupy Paris, as this symbolic gesture will save the city. A line of Sherman tanks set off. Although the equipment is American, they allow the Free French army to control them with just a small American escort. As the line reaches  from Paris, German troops lay explosives in the Eiffel Tower and under various bridges. The Germans release some of the imprisoned men to help defend their strongpoints. The first Sherman arrives and is hit by an artillery shell, but the other tanks, each named for a French victory in the First World War, reach the Hôtel de Ville.

Choltitz chooses not to give the order for the detonations and to surrender shortly after the Allies enter the city. He phones German high command to ask that his family should not suffer for his inaction. Meanwhile, some officers continue to lay explosives. Two officers debate as they lay mines at Napoleon's tomb in Les Invalides.

Deaths occur on both sides but the civilians start to join in the battle. The fight reaches the Rue de Rivoli, where the Germans have their headquarters at the Hotel Meurice. As Allied soldiers enter his office, Choltitz asks that he be allowed to surrender to an officer. He is asked to command some of his officers to drive around with the Free French while displaying a white flag to convey the order of surrender to his troops.

The French tanks reach Notre Dame Cathedral and they reactivate the bells after years of silence. The crowd cheers and sings "La Marseillaise." Real-life documentary footage of the liberation crowds is shown. As the Free French forces and De Gaulle parade down the streets of Paris, greeted by cheering crowds, a phone receiver that is off the hook is seen with a voice in German repeatedly asking "Is Paris burning?" From the air, Paris is seen with its buildings intact, followed by a switch from black and white to color for the closing credits.

Cast

French resistance

Neutral participants 
 Orson Welles as Raoul Nordling, Swedish consul to France

Allied forces

German occupation

Production 
The film is based on the best-selling book by Larry Collins and Dominique Lapierre and was directed by René Clément, from a screenplay by Gore Vidal and Francis Ford Coppola.

The film was shot in black and white mainly because, although the French authorities would allow Nazi swastika flags to be displayed on public buildings for key shots, they would not permit the flags to bear in their original red color; as a result, green swastika flags were used, which photographed adequately in black and white. However, the closing credits feature aerial shots of Paris in color.

The production was filmed at 180 sites throughout Paris, including at Rue de la Huchette, Place des Vosges, Les Invalides, Place de la Concorde, Notre-Dame, the Latin Quarter and Musée Carnavalet. According to screenwriter Francis Ford Coppola, the film's production was strictly controlled by Charles de Gaulle, who would only permit location filming in Paris if his rules were obeyed to the letter. He was particularly concerned with minimizing the part played in the liberation by the French Communist Party. Coppola called de Gaulle's interference blatant political censorship.

Claude Rich plays two parts: General Leclerc, with a moustache, and Lt. Pierre de la Fouchardière, without a moustache, although he is credited only for the part of Leclerc. As a teenager, Rich was watching soldiers in the street when Pierre de la Fouchardière called him into a building to protect him. Orson Welles repeatedly clashed with Clément, refusing to speak directly to him despite being fluent in French. Reportedly, Welles was upset that Clément had been given such a large budget for a project, while he had been struggling to find financing for his own projects.

All sequences featuring French and German actors were filmed in their native languages and later dubbed in English, while all the sequences with the American actors (including Welles) were filmed in English. Separate French and English-language dubs were produced.

Music 
The score was composed by Maurice Jarre, whose music for "The Paris Waltz", with lyrics by Maurice Vidalin, became a patriotic anthem sung by Mireille Mathieu under the title "Paris en colère".

Reception
Is Paris Burning? was the fourth-most-popular film of the year in France for 1966. It received mostly positive reviews from critics. The film holds a 71% approval rating on Rotten Tomatoes, based on 7 reviews.

Awards and honors
The film was nominated for two Academy Awards:
 Best Art Direction (Willy Holt, Marc Frédérix, and Pierre Guffroy)
 Best Cinematography (Marcel Grignon)

In popular culture
The film was spoofed in the September 1967 issue (#113) of Mad magazine under the title "Is Paris Boring?"

See also
Diplomacy - another film about the threatened destruction of Paris

References

Further reading
 Larry Collins and Dominique Lapierre, Is Paris Burning?, New York:  Pocket Books, 1965.

External links
 
 Is Paris Burning? at Le Film Guide

1966 films
1966 war films
American black-and-white films
English-language French films
American World War II films
French World War II films
French epic films
1960s French-language films
French black-and-white films
French war films
Films directed by René Clément
Films with screenplays by Jean Aurenche
Films with screenplays by Pierre Bost
Films with screenplays by Francis Ford Coppola
Films with screenplays by Gore Vidal
Films scored by Maurice Jarre
Films about the French Resistance
Films set in 1944
Films set in Paris
Films shot in Paris
War epic films
World War II films based on actual events
Western Front of World War II films
Cultural depictions of Adolf Hitler
Cultural depictions of George S. Patton
Films based on non-fiction books
1960s American films
1960s French films